The Illegal Migrants (Determination by Tribunals) (IMDT) Act was an Act of the Parliament of India enacted in 1983 by the Indira Gandhi government. It was struck down by the Supreme Court of India in 2005 in Sarbananda Sonowal v. Union of India.

Known as the IMDT Act (1983) it described the procedures to detect illegal immigrants (from Bangladesh) and expel them from Assam. The Act was pushed through mainly on the grounds that it provided special protections against undue harassment to the “minorities” affected by the Assam Agitation. It was applicable to the state of Assam only whereas in other states, detection of foreigners is done under The Foreigners Act, 1946.

The act made it difficult to deport illegal immigrants from Assam.

Salient features
The Foreigners Act, 1946 defines a foreigner as a person who is not a citizen of India. Section 9 of the Act states that, where the nationality of a person is not evident as per preceding section 8, the onus of proving whether a person is a foreigner or not, shall lie upon such person.

However, under the Illegal Migrants (Determination by Tribunal ) (IMDT) Act, the burden of proving the citizenship or otherwise rested on the accuser and the police, not the accused. This was a major departure from the provisions of the Foreigners Act, 1946.

The accuser must reside within a 3 km radius of the accused, fill out a complaint form (a maximum of ten per accuser is allowed) and pay a fee of ten Rupees.

If a suspected illegal migrant is thus successfully accused, he is required by the Act to simply produce a ration card to prove his Indian citizenship.

And if a case made it past these requirements, a system of tribunals made up of retired judges would finally decide on deportation based on the facts.

The act also provided that 'if the application is found frivolous or vexatious' the Central Government may not accept it.

It excluded the migrants who entered India before March 25, 1971 from the illegal-migration accusation. And for post-1971 migrants too, the procedure for deporting were tough.

Supreme Court's views
The Act was challenged by Sarbananda Sonowal in courts. In 2005 a three-judge Bench of the Supreme Court of India held that the Illegal Migrants (Determination by Tribunals) Act, 1983 and rules "has created the biggest hurdle and is the main impediment or barrier in the identification and deportation of illegal migrants" and struck down the Act.

The court also observed "(the conviction rate under the IMDT act) comes to less than half per cent of the cases initiated...(the IMDT Act) is coming to the advantage of such illegal migrants as any proceedings initiated against them almost entirely ends in their favour, enables them to have a document having official sanctity to the effect that they are not illegal migrants."

On 9 August 2012, the Supreme Court hearing a public interest litigation petition  seeking a direction for deportation of illegal migrants, was told that the Government of India, as a matter of policy, "does not support any kind of illegal migration either into its territory or illegal immigration of its citizens. "It was also stated that the Government is committed to deporting illegal Bangladeshi migrants, but only lawfully. It asserted that the demand for deleting the names of alleged 41 lakh doubtful voters from the list of 2006 on the basis of religious and linguistic profiling would prima facie be illegal, arbitrary and violative of the secular and democratic credentials of India. The court  posted the matter for final hearing on 6 November 2012.

See also
 Illegal immigration to India
 Citizenship (Amendment) Act, 2019
 The Foreigners Act, 1946
 Indian nationality law
 National Register of Citizens

References

Further reading
IMDT Act is the biggest barrier to deportation, says Supreme Court, The Hindu, 14 July 2005.
What is the Illegal Migrants Act?, Rediff News, July 2005.
 
 

1980s in Assam
Acts of the Parliament of India 1983
Immigration legislation
Illegal immigration to India
Immigration to India
Indian nationality law
Assamese nationalism
Indira Gandhi administration